The Ukrainian orthography of 2019 is the current version of Ukrainian orthography, prepared by the Ukrainian National Orthography Commission.

A transitional phase is currently underway to implement the new version. During this stage, each institution decides independently on the use of the new version. But the Ukrainian Center for Educational Quality Assessment has been set five years to implement the new standards in external independent evaluation tests.

The new edition brought back to use some features of the Ukrainian orthography of 1928 (the so-called Orthography of Kharkiv), which were part of the Ukrainian orthographic tradition thrown out by the Ukrainian orthography of 1933, which began the Russification of the Ukrainian orthography tradition. At the same time, the commission was guided by the understanding that the language practice of Ukrainians in the second half of the XX – beginning of the XXI century has already become part of the Ukrainian orthography tradition.

Development and implementation 
The Ministry of Education and Science of Ukraine with reference to the National Academy of Sciences of Ukraine explains that the orthography in the previous edition generally met the needs of society and cannot be considered obsolete. It needed only the elimination of certain contradictions, streamlining, clarification and addition in accordance with the modern language trends that have formed in society. This provision was recognized as fair by a significant part of the participants in the public discussion of the new version of the Ukrainian orthography.

In its work, the Ukrainian National Commission on Orthography was guided by the following principles: the need to preserve the Ukrainian orthography tradition; inclusion of new orthography rules necessary for a sufficiently comprehensive codification of language norms; reflection of the main changes in modern language and writing practice; formation of rules for writing new borrowed words, new proper names; elimination of outdated or inaccurate wording; unification of orthography rules.

On , the term of public discussion was extended until . Work on the document was expected to continue at least until the end of 2018; members of the commission declined to comment. However, Maksym Strikha, co-chair of the commission, shared information that the project was approved unanimously.

The orthographic commission stated that

The public discussion of the draft Ukrainian orthography lasted until . More than 500 suggestions, comments and remarks were received. On , the final meeting of the Orthography Commission took place, at which some amendments were made based on the results of the public discussion. On , at a joint meeting of the Presidium of the NAS of Ukraine and the Board of the MES, the report of the Chairman of the Working Group on drafting the Ukrainian orthography of the corresponding member of the NAS of Ukraine Svitlana Yermolenko "On the new edition of the Ukrainian orthography"; the draft orthography was approved and recommended to be submitted to the Cabinet of Ministers for approval after completion

On , the final version was published on the official websites of the Ministry of Education and Science and the National Academy of Sciences.

A transitional phase is currently underway to implement the new version. During this stage, each institution decides independently on the use of the new version. However, the Ukrainian Center for Educational Quality Assessment has been set five years to implement the new standards in external independent evaluation tests.

On , the publishing house Naukova Dumka of the National Academy of Sciences of Ukraine, as an authorized institution, published an authorized edition of the new edition.

Major changes to the 1993 orthography

Critics 
Writer Andrii Kokotiukha believes that orthography will make learning the Ukrainian language more difficult: "I am in favor of Ukrainian citizens mastering the Ukrainian language in general. Because half of the population did not follow the norms of the old orthography. And some of those who use the language in everyday life did not know about the existence of norms as such. I will write as I wrote. After all, the new orthography provides for the rules "and so it is possible, and so it is possible." If there is something critical, there are editors, professional broadcasters. In fact, these innovations will repel those who have just started using Ukrainian due to various circumstances. And some carriers will just be ironic, like me."

Writer Maryna Hrymych criticized the feminatives: "I use the masculine gender not because I do not respect women's rights (I am constantly fighting against patriarchal atavisms with artistic words and non-artistic deeds), but because I know what has historically happened in Slavic languages. That in many cases the masculine semantically plays the role of "unisex" and "gender neutral". This is a unique feature of the Ukrainian language. I love it. Sorry who does not agree. Trained linguists will understand me. "

Philologist Andrii Karbivnychyi also spoke sharply against feminists: "This is a kind of savage madness. In a country where half of the population speaks horrible surzhyk, and the other – parody Russian-speaking, some certified idiots, under the guise of an absurd struggle for gender equality, with impunity mutilate the unfortunate-beautiful Ukrainian, all these all these "членкиня, спортовками, мисткинями, and now фізикинями, психологинями and математикинями."

Writer Radii Radutnyi stated that he did not plan to follow the rules of the new orthography.

Volunteer Roman Donik believes that femininities are inappropriate in the document flow of the Armed Forces: "There is a солдат, a сержант and an офіцер. There aren't even any солдатка or офіцерка. And there are no стрільчиха."

Former director of the Ukrainian Center for Educational Quality Assessment Likarchuk Ihor comments on orthography as follows:I read all this and think: will I personally communicate in the latest or, as Pronya Prokopivna said, "in a fashionable way", like «міністерка», «лікарка», «етер»? I come to the conclusion that it is unlikely to succeed. Because I believe that the return to the orthography of 1919 is not a well-founded decision. And such that on time. Apparently, it's good to have a retro car from 1919. To show off on it once or twice a year at a show. Users of the site accepted the changes in spelling coldly (for example, writing the word project through the letter is supported by only 15% of users of the Izbornyk). The only proposal for the spelling project that was supported by the respondents with a significant advantage (74%) was to write names related to religion in capital letters. When asked whether spelling reform is needed, the pros and cons were also roughly divided. A total of 51% believe that reform is needed; of these, only 22% said they needed it immediately, 29% said they needed it, but not on time. Almost half of the respondents said that spelling reform is not needed – 47%.

Court appeal 
In June 2019, the District Administrative Court of Kyiv received a lawsuit to invalidate and cancel the Resolution of the Cabinet of Ministers of Ukraine No. 437 of  "Issues of Ukrainian orthography". The lawsuit was filed by Dmytro Ilchenko, a senior partner at the Konstanta law firm, on behalf of a seventh-grader and her mother. A similar lawsuit was filed by the NGO "Constitutional state" (lawyer – Rostyslav Kravets).

, the District Administrative Court of Kyiv overturned the Resolution of the Cabinet of Ministers on the transition to a new orthography, however, the decision of the court of first instance was overturned on appeal.

Opinion of scientists 

 Candidate of Philological Sciences Olena Brosalina approved the changes:
I really liked that a very wise decision was made: to allow parallel use. Fans will be able to feel free, but not fans will be able to orient themselves, feel the taste of new words, new forms.
 Doctor of Philology Iryna Farion wrote:...long-overdue proposals related to the de-Russification and de-Sovietization of the Ukrainian orthography are half-hearted due to the variant use (інший / инший, Гегель / Геґель, аудиторія / авдиторія, ефір / етер, вікенд / Уельс, Вайнрайх / Гейне, Сідней / Сирія, бюст / б'ю, в кіно / в пальті, незалежності / незалежности), and some remain in the Soviet-Moscow version (матеріальний). Positive innovations (or rather the return of the positive) are small, semi-bold steps that seem to have frightened the authors of the changes themselves (проєкт, дієреза, рієлтор; -ай instead -ей in German borrowings; interpretation of active adjectives; expanding the scope of the exclamatory case). However, variability is, without a doubt, much better than staying specific to codification.
 Associate Professor of the Department of Ukrainian Language and Applied Linguistics of the Taras Shevchenko Institute of Philology Victoria Kolomyitseva:I am not in favor of having many exceptions to the rules. Especially - unmotivated. Orthography should be organized in such a way as to help improve people's literacy. And if people are "confused": then something is written through a hyphen, then separately — it does not improve the overall situation and literacy. And people are uncomfortable. Even if it is better than it was, it takes time to adapt. There will still be problems — you need to "relearn".
 Doctor of Philology Oleksandr Ponomariv, in general, approved the direction of change:
Unfortunately, the new version of the Ukrainian Orthography did not achieve everything I wanted, but I support what has been achieved, because these changes at least partially return to our orthography its national face.
 Doctor of Philosophy Arsen Zinchenko:
Ukraine has long had to return to its specific principles in all spheres of life... I have long been writing my books in a modernized version of the orthography of 1928".
 Associate Professor of Ukrainian Language and Applied Linguistics, Institute of Philology, Taras Shevchenko National University of Kyiv Serhii Riznyk criticized the variability:
Orthography is a code of language laws and norms. If it is not clear and strict, but allows the use of alternative forms of words, it can undermine respect for other laws that no longer regulate linguistic norms, but legal or social. Perhaps it would be worthwhile to involve a wider range of specialists in the discussion of certain orthography problems and eventually adopt those options for writing words that are more in line with the natural features of the language and, according to experts, have better prospects for perception by most speakers.
 Oleksandr Skopnenko, an employee of the OO Potebny Institute of Linguistics of the National Academy of Sciences of Ukraine and a candidate of philological sciences, explained the main changes as follows: Secondly, the new version of the orthography should codify and return to active use the rules that have long existed in the Ukrainian language.
 Mykola Stepanenko, Doctor of Philology:We say that the Ukrainian tradition was most consistently reflected in the orthography of 1928 — "Skrypnykivka" or "Orthography of Kharkiv", then some norms of the 28th year were returned here. It is clear that not all, although there were hopes for a greater entry of what once was, the return of these traditions.
 Doctor of Philology Anatolii Tkachenko has a positive attitude to the use of the letter "ґ" in the transliteration of surnames (Геґель), at least Western figures, as well as a reproduction of the German diphthong «ei» like «ай» (Ваймар, Ляйпціґ, Гайнріх Гайне).
 Candidate of Philological Sciences Yuriш Shevchuk believed that the reform still leaves the Ukrainian language in the field of Russification:
The draft actually continues the Soviet policy of shaking the Ukrainian language from within, likening it to Russian not in everything, but on a number of important points. The draft too often reveals its pro-Russian essence.

Publications of the draft and the approved orthography variant

Draft publications 

 Ukrainian orthography: draft (for discussion) / Prepared by the working group of the Ukrainian National Commission on Orthography. — No source data. —  216 pages. (Published on August 22, 2018.)
 Ukrainian orthography: draft (for discussion) / Prepared by the working group of the Ukrainian National Commission on Orthography. — No source data. — 216 pages. (Published on August 15, 2018.)
 On the website of the Ministry of Education and Science of Ukraine.

Publications of the approved orthography variant 

 The text of the official publication on the website the Institute of Linguistics. OO Potebny NASU.

See also 

 Russification of Ukraine
 Ukrainian orthography of 1928
 Ukrainian orthography of 1933

References

Further reading 

 Lina Teslenko. «Индик не проходить». Maxim Strikha on why Ukrainians should not be afraid of the new orthography // «Novynarnia», October 17, 2018
 Lina Teslenko. Updated Ukrainian orthography: what has changed and what is missing // «Novynarnia», May 27, 2019
 Serhii Drachuk. 20 biggest innovations of Ukrainian orthography in 2019 // Radio Svoboda, June 29, 2019

2019 in Ukraine
Ukrainian language
Ukrainian orthography